Eremophila woodiae is a flowering plant in the figwort family, Scrophulariaceae and is endemic to western central Queensland. It is a small shrub with linear to lance-shaped leaves crowded near the ends of the branches, hairy sepals and violet to light purple petals.

Description
The upper lip has two lobes and the lower lip has three lobes divided for most of their length, the central lobes slightly longer and broader than the lateral lobes. Two of the four stamens are fully enclosed in the petal tube and the other two extend slightly beyond.

Taxonomy and naming 
Eremophila woodiae was first formally described in 2015 by Mark Alexander Edginton in the journal Austrobaileya. The specific epithet (woodiae) honours Aileen Wood, a long-term staff member at the Queensland Herbarium.

Distribution and habitat 
This eremophila grows in sparse, stunted woodland on barren plateaux near Opalton and Vergemont, west of Longreach and south of Winton in western central Queensland.

Conservation status
Eremophila woodiae is classified as of "least concern" under the Queensland Government Nature Conservation Act 1992.

References

woodiae
Flora of Queensland
Plants described in 2015